The estuarine sea catfish (Cathorops aguadulce), also known as the Aguadulce sea catfish, is a species of sea catfish in the family Ariidae. It was described by Seth Eugene Meek in 1904, originally under the genus Galeichthys. It is a tropical fish which is known from Mexico to Guatemala, where it typically inhabits freshwater rivers, lagoons, and drainages, also sometimes dwelling in marine waters.

References

Ariidae
Fish described in 1904
Taxa named by Seth Eugene Meek